The Order of National Heroes is the supreme honour within the national honours system of Barbados and was established by the Order of National Heroes Act 1998 by the Parliament of Barbados. Members are referred to as National Heroes, and are accorded the style "The Right Excellent" and the post-nominal letters "NH". The Order recognises the most prominent figures in Barbados' history. As of 2023, Garfield Sobers and Rihanna are the only two living persons conferred with the title.

History 

The first National Heroes Day was celebrated on 28 April 1998, the centenary of the birth of Sir Grantley Adams. On the same day, Trafalgar Square was renamed National Heroes Square.

Eleven people have been created National Heroes of Barbados to date, of which ten were nominated by Prime Minister Owen Arthur and formally appointed by the Governor General in 1998, in accordance with the Act. Of the original ten, only Sir Garfield Sobers is alive; Sarah Ann Gill was the only woman to be created a National Hero until the singer and businesswoman Rihanna was honoured in November 2021.

The Barbados National Heroes Gallery, located in the Museum of Parliament, traces the lives and contributions made by the National Heroes.

In 2021, the Government started a search for new National Heroes. Citizens were encouraged to nominate people who they thought qualified for the high honour. The government of Barbados ultimately chose singer Rihanna for this honour and duly awarded her the title of National Hero on the first day of the Barbadian republic.

The president, being the legal successor to the governor-general, adopted the latter's role and duties of appointing national heroes after Barbados became a republic  in 2021.

National Heroes 

The Right Excellent Bussa (also known as Busso or Bussoe) (died 1816)
The Right Excellent Sarah Ann Gill (1795–1866)
The Right Excellent Samuel Jackman Prescod (1806–1871)
The Right Excellent Charles Duncan O'Neal (1879–1936)
The Right Excellent Sir Grantley Herbert Adams  (1898–1971)
The Right Excellent Clement Osbourne Payne (1904–1941)
The Right Excellent Sir Hugh Worrell Springer  (1913–1994)
The Right Excellent Sir Frank Leslie Walcott ,  (1916–1999)
The Right Excellent Errol Walton Barrow  (1920–1987)
The Right Excellent Sir Garfield St Aubrun Sobers , OCC (born 1936)
The Right Excellent Robyn Rihanna Fenty (born 1988)

References 

Hero (title)
Barbadian culture
National symbols of Barbados
National Heroes of Barbados
National Hero
Awards established in 1998